John Duus (born 11 April 1955) is a Norwegian sport shooter. He competed in 50 metre rifle, prone and 50 metre rifle three positions at the 1984 Summer Olympics in Los Angeles.

References

External links

1955 births
Living people
Norwegian male sport shooters
Olympic shooters of Norway
Shooters at the 1984 Summer Olympics
Sportspeople from Oslo
20th-century Norwegian people